Cydia honorana is a species of moth belonging to the family Tortricidae first described by Gottlieb August Wilhelm Herrich-Schäffer in 1851.

References

Grapholitini